Window Peak is located in the Teton Range, Grand Teton National Park in the U.S. state of Wyoming. The peak is in the western reaches of Moran Canyon.

References

Mountains of Grand Teton National Park
Mountains of Wyoming
Mountains of Teton County, Wyoming